The Promised Land is a Canadian historical drama television miniseries by the National Film Board of Canada. It was first broadcast in 1957 on Radio-Canada, then dubbed into English and adapted for broadcast by CBC Television as a four-part series in 1962. The NFB now classifies it as a feature film.

Premise
The series was adapted from the Hervé Biron novel Nuages sur les brûlés concerning the 1930s settlement of Quebec's Abitibi district and the workers who toiled to develop the area during the Great Depression. Episodes included music and appearances by folk musician Félix Leclerc. It was broadcast on Radio-Canada as an eight-part series for the network's Panoramique anthology.

The $144,000 production was also released as a 114-minute feature film in 1959 as a condensed version of the television footage.

Scheduling
Les brûlés was first broadcast on Radio-Canada on Fridays at 9 p.m. starting 15 November 1957. The Promised Land adaptation was broadcast as half-hour episodes Sundays at 10:30 p.m. (Eastern) from 16 September to 7 October 1962 on CBC Television.

References

External links
 
 The Promised Land at the National Film Board of Canada
 

CBC Television original programming
Ici Radio-Canada Télé original programming
National Film Board of Canada series
1957 Canadian television series debuts
1957 Canadian television series endings
1950s Canadian drama television series
Works about human migration
Television series about the history of Canada
Television shows based on Canadian novels
Films set in Abitibi-Témiscamingue
Films produced by Guy Glover
1950s Canadian television miniseries
Black-and-white Canadian television shows